Prodasineura verticalis is a damselfly in the family Platycnemididae. It is commonly known as the red-striped black bambootail or black bambootail.

Distribution 
Prodasineura verticalis can be found in these Asian countries, which are  China, Guangxi, India, Indonesia, Laos, Malaysia, Peninsular Malaysia Myanmar, Singapore, and Thailand.

Subspecies 
This damselfly species has six subspecies. The following are the subspecies.
Prodasineura verticalis andamanensis (Andaman and Nicobar Islands)
Prodasineura verticalis annandalei (South India)
Prodasineura verticalis burmanensis 
Prodasineura verticalis delia 
Prodasineura verticalis humeralis (often treated as a distinct species)
Prodasineura verticalis verticalis

Description and habitat

It is medium size damselfly with black-capped brown eyes. Its hindwings are about 19–20 mm and the abdomen about 30 mm. The male of this damselfly is mostly black with red and yellow stripes on its thorax and small yellow spots on the abdomen. The pterostigma or the wing spot is diamond-shaped and is dark brown in colour. Abdomen is black with segments 3 to 6 have small base-dorsal yellow spots. Remaining segments are unmarked. The female is similarly marked to the male; but the thoracic stripes are paler and more yellowish. 

They are commonly found along the banks of large ponds and rivers, usually sitting among emergent water plants. The oviposition takes place on vegetation or on submerged roots in shallow running water, with the pair in tandem.

See also 
 List of odonates of India
 List of odonata of Kerala

References

External links

Platycnemididae
Insects described in 1860